Elumur is a village located in the Perambalur district of Tamil Nadu, India. The village is a home to the 
Perambalur District

References

Cities and towns in Perambalur district